Ergué-Gabéric (An Erge Vras in Breton) is a commune in the Finistère department of Brittany in north-western France. It lies on the Odet river. The businessman and publisher Gwenn-Aël Bolloré was born in the commune.

Population

International relations
It is twinned with Stratton, Cornwall.

Sights
The church of Saint Gwenhael has a 17th century organ by Thomas Dallam II and his son Toussaint.

Breton language
In 2008, 6.62% of primary-school children attended bilingual schools, where Breton language is taught alongside French.

Twinning 
Ergue-Gaberic is twinned with Bude–Stratton in Cornwall, England.

See also
Communes of the Finistère department

References

External links

 Official site 
 Le Blog de l'Observatoire Citoyen d'Ergué-Gabéric 
 Le site de l'Observatoire Citoyen d'Ergué-Gabéric 
 
 Defense of History and Traditions Heritage for Ergué-Gabéric  & (Breton)

Communes of Finistère